National Hotel is a historic hotel located at Cuylerville in Livingston County, New York. It is a large 2-story, seven-by-three-bay Federal / Greek Revival–style frame structure. It was built in 1841 and was reputedly a station on the Underground Railroad.

It was listed on the National Register of Historic Places in 2004.

References

External links
National Hotel - Cuylerville, New York - U.S. National Register of Historic Places on Waymarking.com

Hotel buildings on the National Register of Historic Places in New York (state)
Federal architecture in New York (state)
Underground Railroad locations
Buildings and structures in Livingston County, New York
National Register of Historic Places in Livingston County, New York
1841 establishments in New York (state)